Tancarville is a commune in the Seine-Maritime department in the Normandy region of northern France.

Geography
The canal de Tancarville to le Havre starts here and it is also the site of the 125 m high Tancarville Bridge.

History
Tancarvilla 1103; Tancardi villae 1114; Tankrad'''s farm. Germanic male given name Tankrad > Tancred, common in the duchy of Normandy. The first lords of Tancarville were the chamberlains of the Norman dukes, and then of the King of England too. William de Tancarville, a grandson of Stephen, Count of Tréguier, trained William Marshal, 1st Earl of Pembroke, whom he knighted in 1166. The title Earl of Tankerville was created in the Peerage of England for John Grey by King Henry V, during the Hundred Years' War and still exists, albeit in a later creation.

Heraldry

Population

Places of interest

 The 19th-century church of St. Michel
 The 12th-century Château de Tancarville and chapel
 An 18th-century château
 The château of Drumare
 The Tancarville Bridge
 Vivier de Tancarville'', a large natural reserve

See also
Tancarville Bridge
Communes of the Seine-Maritime department

References

External links

 History of Chateau de Tancarville with images

Communes of Seine-Maritime